In mathematics, in particular in homotopy theory within algebraic topology, the homotopy lifting property (also known as an instance of the right lifting property or the covering homotopy axiom) is a technical condition on a continuous function from a topological space E to another one, B. It is designed to support the picture of E "above" B by allowing a homotopy taking place in B to be moved "upstairs" to E.

For example, a covering map has a property of unique local lifting of paths to a given sheet; the uniqueness is because the fibers of a covering map are discrete spaces. The homotopy lifting property will hold in many situations, such as the projection in a vector bundle, fiber bundle or fibration, where there need be no unique way of lifting.

Formal definition
Assume from now on all maps are continuous functions from one topological space to another.

for any homotopy , and 
for any map  lifting  (i.e., so that ),

there exists a homotopy  lifting  (i.e., so that ) which also satisfies .

The following diagram depicts this situation:

The outer square (without the dotted arrow) commutes if and only if the hypotheses of the lifting property are true. A lifting  corresponds to a dotted arrow making the diagram commute. This diagram is dual to that of the homotopy extension property; this duality is loosely referred to as Eckmann–Hilton duality.

If the map  satisfies the homotopy lifting property with respect to all spaces , then  is called a fibration, or one sometimes simply says that  has the homotopy lifting property.

A weaker notion of fibration is Serre fibration, for which homotopy lifting is only required for all CW complexes .

Generalization: homotopy lifting extension property
There is a common generalization of the homotopy lifting property and the homotopy extension property.  Given a pair of spaces , for simplicity we denote .  Given additionally a map , one says that  has the homotopy lifting extension property if:
 For any homotopy , and

See also
 Covering space
 Fibration

Notes

References
 
 
 
 .
 Jean-Pierre Marquis (2006) "A path to Epistemology of Mathematics: Homotopy theory", pages 239 to 260 in The Architecture of Modern Mathematics, J. Ferreiros & J.J. Gray, editors, Oxford University Press

External links
 
 

Homotopy theory
Algebraic topology